The Eureka College Administration Building and Chapel are the two oldest buildings on the campus of Eureka College in Eureka, Illinois. The administration building was built in 1858; as the campus became too large to fit in one building, the chapel was added in 1869. The buildings were the only ones at the college for almost twenty-five years and are still the focal point of the campus. In addition to their role in the college's history, both buildings are architecturally significant. The administration building has an Italianate design, which can be seen most prominently in the frieze and roof overhang, with Federal-influenced windows and Georgian main entrances. The chapel has an Italian Villa design with bracketed eaves and tall, thin arched windows.

The buildings were added to the National Register of Historic Places on May 31, 1980.

References

University and college buildings on the National Register of Historic Places in Illinois
Georgian architecture in Illinois
Federal architecture in Illinois
Italianate architecture in Illinois
School buildings completed in 1858
Religious buildings and structures completed in 1869
National Register of Historic Places in Woodford County, Illinois
1858 establishments in Illinois
Eureka College
Individually listed contributing properties to historic districts on the National Register in Illinois
University and college chapels in the United States